The Hurel-Dubois HD.31, HD.32, and HD.34 were a family of civil aircraft produced in France in the 1950s, based on Maurice Hurel's high aspect ratio wing designs.

Design and construction
Tests with the Hurel-Dubois HD.10 research aircraft had validated Hurel's ideas about the practicality of such wings, and the French government agreed to sponsor the construction of two prototypes of a medium-range airliner utilising this same principle. These aircraft, the HD.31 and HD.32 were conventional designs in all respects other than their unorthodox wings, and differed from one another only in their powerplants, although both were later converted to use the same engines. The twin-tails originally fitted were also later replaced by a large single tail fin assisted by smaller auxiliary fins. With their new engines and tails, they were redesignated HD.321.01 and HD.321.02.  Apart from the HD.34 survey aircraft, all had fixed, faired tricycle undercarriages.

Production and Operation

Two HD.31s were ordered by the French government but only one was built, the Wright Cyclone-powered HD.31 F-WFKU flew on the 27 January 1953. The company then produced a Pratt & Whitney R-1830-92-powered variant, the HD.32. Other than the engines it was the same as the HD.31. Keeping the original twin tails of the prototype the first HD.32 flew on 29 December 1953. The engines were changed to 1525 hp Wright 982-4 engines and to counter the increased power the twin fin was replaced by a single one and the type was redesigated the HD.321. The second HD.32 which first flew in February 1955 was also modified to HD.321 standard.

Air France originally placed an order for 24 aircraft in November 1953 to use as feederliners, it was followed by an order for four for the Institut Géographique National and four for Aigle Azur. With these orders discussion took place with SNCASE to build and market up to 150 aircraft. None were actually built for Air France or Aigle Azur but the IGN continued to be interested in an aerial photography variant to replace the Boeing B-17 Flying Fortress the company was then using. Eight aircraft were ordered by the IGN, based at Creil airfield to the north of Paris. The aircraft's wing design made it ideal for long-duration, low-speed flight, ideal for aerial photography and survey work. These machines were designated HD.34 and were fitted with an extensively glazed nose and an offset retractable nosewheel. They flew with IGN between the late 1950s and mid 1970s. A single example remains airworthy, operated by the Association des Mécaniciens-Pilotes d'Aéronefs Anciens.

The Aeronatique Naval evaluated the HD.31 and the company proposed an anti-submarine warfare variant to meet a requirement for 100 aircraft but nothing materialised.

Variants

 HD.31 - Prototype with  Wright Cyclone C7BA1 radial engines. One built.
 HD.32 - Two  Pratt & Whitney R-1830-92 radial engines and fitted with twin fins. Two built - later converted to HD.321s.
 HD.321 - Conversion of HD.32 with  Wright Cyclone 982 engines and single central and two small auxiliary fins.
 HD.324 - turboprop version with Rolls-Royce Dart engines. (not built)
 HD.33
 HD.331 - projected militarised version for use as troop transport or air ambulance. (not built)
 HD.34 - Aerial survey version for IGN, powered by  Cyclone R1820 C.9 HE engines, with retractable, offset nosewheel and lengthened, glazed nose. Eight built.
 HD.35 - Proposed anti-submarine variant for the French Navy, not built.
 HD.36 - Proposed anti-submarine variant for the French Navy, not built.
 HD.37 - a proposed car-ferry version, not built.

Operators

French Air Force - one HD.321
 French government - one HD.321
French Naval Aviation - the HD.31 was used for evaluation
Institut Geographique National - eight HD.34s

Accidents and Incidents 
Of the HD.31, HD.32, and HD.34 family, there have been two accidents, both involving Hurel-Dubois HD.32s;

 On 30 October, 1956, an HD.321 crashed into Guanabara Bay near Rio de Janeiro, Brazil, during a demonstration flight prior to celebrations in Rio de Janeiro surrounding the 50th anniversary of Alberto Santos-Dumont's first flight. One passenger died in the accident.
 On 10 May 1960, an HD.32 overran the wet grass runway at Villemoleix, France, hit a power pole and came to rest in a pond. The aircraft, operated by l'Armée de L'Air, was damaged beyond repair.

Specifications (HD.321)

Notes

Bibliography

 
 
 

 
 
 
 
 
 
 
 

1950s French airliners
Hurel-Dubois aircraft
High-wing aircraft
Aircraft first flown in 1953
Twin piston-engined tractor aircraft
Twin-tail aircraft